This is a list of people assassinated by the West German left-wing terrorist group Red Army Faction or the Baader-Meinhof group.

References 

Lists of assassinations
Terrorist incidents in France
Terrorist incidents in Germany
Terrorist incidents in the Netherlands
Terrorist incidents in Sweden